Sir Frank Edward Figgures KCB CMG (5 March 1910 – 27 November 1990) was a British civil servant, noted as the first secretary-general of the European Free Trade Association from 1960 to 1965. In this position he promoted a more united Europe through economic cooperation.

Figgures was educated at Rutlish School, New College and Merton College, and Yale Law School. He was called to the Bar in 1936.

Figgures served in the Royal Artillery during World War II. In 1946 he served as under-Secretary to HM Treasury, helping in Britain's recovery effort, and from 1948 to 1951 he served as Director of Trade and Finance for the Organisation for Economic Co-operation and Development. He served in various other treasury positions before heading the EFTA in 1960.

References

1910 births
1990 deaths
British Army personnel of World War II
Civil servants in HM Treasury
Companions of the Order of St Michael and St George
European Free Trade Association
Knights Commander of the Order of the Bath
OECD officials
Place of birth missing
Place of death missing
Royal Artillery officers
Alumni of New College, Oxford
Alumni of Merton College, Oxford